Gilmore is an unincorporated community in Effingham County, Illinois, United States.

References

Unincorporated communities in Effingham County, Illinois
Unincorporated communities in Illinois